Wappenham was a railway station on the Stratford-upon-Avon and Midland Junction Railway (SMJ) which served the Northamptonshire village of Wappenham between 1872 and 1951. Serving a relatively rural area, the station saw considerable goods traffic generated by local farming communities, but passenger traffic was low which ultimately led to its closure.

History 
A small wayside station was constructed in an isolated spot about a mile from the village of Wappenham from which it took its name. A single-platform was provided on the down side, with a single siding goods yard to the east. The siding was linked to the main line at each end, forming a loop which enabled the yard to be shunted by up or down trains.

The station served as a useful railhead not only for Wappenham, but also the nearby villages of Slapton and Abthorpe, whose farming communities made use of it for hay and cattle traffic. The station's siding was also of use to RAF Silverstone during the Second World War. Passenger traffic was however sparse, Wappenham was only a small village of 383 people in 1901, and it was one of the least successful in terms of passenger traffic on the line. Goods traffic continued for three more months.

Routes

Present day 
The station buildings were demolished after closure and a sewage treatment works has been built on the former railway alignment.

References

Disused railway stations in Northamptonshire
Former Stratford-upon-Avon and Midland Junction Railway stations
Railway stations in Great Britain opened in 1872
Railway stations in Great Britain closed in 1951
West Northamptonshire District